Duke of Alburquerque is a hereditary title in the Peerage of Spain, accompanied by the dignity of Grandee and granted in 1464 by Henry IV to Beltrán de la Cueva, his "royal favourite" and grand master of the Order of Santiago. It makes reference to the town of Alburquerque in Badajoz, Spain.

Dukes of Alburquerque

Beltrán de la Cueva, 1st Duke of Alburquerque (1464–1492)
Francisco Fernández de la Cueva, 2nd Duke of Alburquerque (1492–1526)
Beltrán de la Cueva, 3rd Duke of Alburquerque (1526–1560)
Francisco Fernández de la Cueva, 4th Duke of Alburquerque (1560–1563)
Gabriel de la Cueva, 5th Duke of Alburquerque (1563–1571)
Beltrán III de la Cueva y Castilla, 6th Duke of Alburquerque (1571–1612), Viceroy of Aragón
Francisco Fernández de la Cueva, 7th Duke of Alburquerque (1612–1637)
Francisco Fernández de la Cueva, 8th Duke of Alburquerque (1637–1676), Viceroy of New Spain
Melchor Fernández de la Cueva y Enríquez de Cabrera, 9th Duke of Alburquerque (1676–1686), Capitán General de la Mar Oceano
Francisco Fernández de la Cueva, 10th Duke of Alburquerque (1686–1733), Viceroy of New Spain
Francisco VI Fernández de la Cueva y de la Cerda, 11th Duke of Alburquerque (1733–1757), Capitán General de la Mar Oceano and Caballerizo mayor del Rey
Pedro Miguel de la Cueva y Guzmán, 12th Duke of Alburquerque (1757–1762), Mariscal de Campo de los Reales Ejércitos
Miguel de la Cueva y Enríquez de Navarra, 13th Duke of Alburquerque (1762–1803), Viceroy of Aragón
José María de la Cueva, 14th Duke of Alburquerque (1803–1811), Spanish general during the Peninsular War and a Spanish ambassador to London
Nicolás Osorio y Zayas, 15th Duke of Alburquerque (1830–1866), Senator and Mayordomo mayor del Rey consorte
José Osorio y Silva, 16th Duke of Alburquerque (1866–1909), Mayor of Madrid
Miguel Osorio y Martos, 17th Duke of Alburquerque (1910–1942), Gentilhombre Grande de España con ejercicio y servidumbre
Beltrán Alfonso Osorio, 18th Duke of Alburquerque (1942–1994), jockey
Juan Miguel Osorio y Bertrán de Lis, 19th Duke of Alburquerque (born 1958), the current holder of the ducal title.

See also
List of dukes in the peerage of Spain
List of current Grandees of Spain

References

 
Dukedoms of Spain